Social Psychological and Personality Science is a peer-reviewed academic journal that covers research in social and personality psychology. Its editor-in-chief is Margo Monteith (Purdue University). It was established in 2010 and is published by SAGE Publications. The journal is jointly owned by four different societies: the Association for Research in Personality, European Association of Social Psychology, Society of Experimental Social Psychology, and Society for Personality and Social Psychology.

Abstracting and indexing 
The journal is abstracted and indexed in PsycINFO and Scopus. According to the Journal Citation Reports, its 2018 impact factor is 3.605, ranking it 6 out of 63 journals in the category "Psychology, Social".

References

External links

SAGE Publishing academic journals
English-language journals
Personality journals
Quarterly journals
Publications established in 2010
Differential psychology journals
Social psychology journals
Academic journals associated with learned and professional societies
8 times per year journals